Graphis caribica is a species of lichen in the family Graphidaceae. Found in Dominica, it was described as new to science in 2011. It has since been reported from the Philippines.

References

Lichens described in 2011
Lichen species
Lichens of Malesia
Lichens of the Caribbean
caribica
Taxa named by Robert Lücking